The Let L-410 Turbolet is a twin-engine short-range transport aircraft, manufactured by the Czech aircraft manufacturer Let Kunovice (named Aircraft Industries since 2005), often used as an airliner. By 2016, 1,200 L-410s had been built, and over 350 are in service in more than 50 countries.

Development

Development of the L-410 was started in the 1960s by the Czechoslovak aircraft manufacturer Let Kunovice. The Soviet airline Aeroflot was looking for a turboprop-powered replacement for the Antonov An-2 aircraft, initiating the design development by Let. After preliminary studies of an aircraft called the L-400, a new version was introduced called the L-410 Turbolet. The first prototype, designated XL-410, flew on April 16, 1969. Because of delays in the development of a suitable Czech engine (Walter M601), the prototype and first production version were powered by Pratt & Whitney Canada PT6-27 engines.

After M601 development was completed, the PT6 engine was replaced by M601 engines coupled with Avia V508 three-blade propellers and the next variant was introduced, the L-410M.

A further version for Aeroflot was the L-410 UVP. This has improved performance in take-off and landing due to increased wing and tail area - STOL. However, due to an increased empty weight and a shift in the center of gravity, the aircraft had a decreased seating capacity of 15 passengers.

First flight was made in 1984, and production started in 1986.

The L-410 UVP-E9 and UVP-E20 are versions which vary from each other only by minor changes arising from various certification regulations. The last L-410 family member is the L-420 which uses the new Walter engine variant, the M601F. Currently produced L-410 UVP-E20s are powered by next derivative of M601 engine designated as GE H80-200 and new Avia Propeller AV-725 five blade propellers.

The L-420 was first approved by the US FAA on March 11, 1998, then the L-410 UVP-E20 on June 30, 2015.
The L-410 UVP-E20 was EASA certified on 4 February 2005 on the other variants on 28 March 2007.

On 3 September 2013 the Russian company UGMK (Iskander Machmudov) became the majority owner of LET Kunovice Aircraft Industries. They announced that they would produce the L-410 also in Russia within the year.
On 7 July 2015 UGMK represented first L 410 NG aircraft manufactured in Russia.

Design 

The L-410 UVP-E is an unpressurized all-metal high-wing commuter aircraft, with Avia V 510 five-blade propellers. It is equipped with a retractable undercarriage. The aircraft uses two hydraulic circuits: main and emergency. The main electrical system operates with 28V DC. The de-icing system is leading edge pneumatic deicers and electrical heating of propellers, cockpit windshields and pitot-static system heads. The airplane is certified for IFR operation, CAT I ILS approach, and flights in icing conditions.

The L 410 UVP-E20 is certified on the basis of FAR 23 either Amendment 34 or Amendment 41. It is certified by the EU, the Russian Federation, the US, Brazil, Argentina, Chile, Peru, Venezuela, Cuba, India, Nepal, Philippines, Korea, Indonesia, Republic of South Africa, Algeria, Australia, Taiwan, Turkey, and many other countries accepting some of the previous certificates. The aircraft has also been approved for operation in a number of other countries, such as Kenya, Tanzania, Uganda, Tunisia, Colombia, Venezuela, South Korea and others.

Variants

 L-410: Prototype, three units built.
 L-410A: First series with Pratt & Whitney PT6A-27 turbo-prop engines. Twelve built.
 L-410AB: Version with four-bladed propellers.
 L-410AF: Aerial photo version supplied to Hungary.
 L-410AG: With modified equipment. Never built.
 L-410AS: Test aircraft, supplied to the USSR. Five airplanes built
 L-410FG: Aerial photography version based on L-410UVP
 L-410M: Second series with Walter M601A engines.
 L-410AM: Version with improved M601Bs, also known as L-410MA or L-410MU.
 L-410 UVP: (Ukorochennaya vzlot-posadka, "short take-off and landing") Third series, fundamentally modified. The UVP variants possesses STOL characteristics.
 L-410 UVP-S: Salon variant of the UVP with upward hinged entrance hatch.
 L-410 UVP-E: Re-equipped with M601Es, five-bladed Avia V510 propellers, additional fuel tanks at the wing ends.
 L-410T: Transport variant of the UVP with larger loading hatch, can transport 6 stretchers as a medical airplane with a medic, or 12 parachutists. It can also carry  of cargo containers.
 L-420: upgraded L-410 UVP-E -  new M601Fs, certified variant of the L-410 UVP-E20
 L 410 NG: New version featuring a longer nose and a larger rear area to contain twice as much luggage, new more powerful and quieter GE H85 engines with propellers Avia-725, new wing design and a new modern Garmin G3000 glass cockpit. It has a double range and more endurance compared to the original types. It made its first flight on 29 July 2015. FAA, EASA and Russian certification took place in late 2017. Serial production began in March 2018.

Operators

Many L-410s were delivered to the former Soviet Union and ex-Soviet states and stayed there and in Russia, but some have been also sold to airlines in Asia, Africa, Central America, and South America. Forty aircraft are in use throughout Europe for commercial operations or skydiving.

Civilian

In July 2015, 178 Let L-410 were in airline service: 73 in Africa, 58 in Europe, 41 in Americas and 6 in Asia Pacific and the Middle East; its airline operators with four or more aircraft were:
 25: Air-Tec Global
 8: Orenburzhie Air Company
 7: Searca
 5: Kin Avia and Petropavlovsk-Kamchatsky Air Enterprise
 4: Air Express Algeria, Eagle Air, Solenta Aviation, 2nd Arkhangelsk United Aviation Division, Van Air Europe, Komiaviatrans, KrasAvia, Air Guyane Express and Comeravia

Accidents and incidents

The L 410 has experienced 116 accidents with 426 fatalities. The aircraft design may have less influence than operations procedures on the safety record.

Specifications (L-410 UVP-E20)

See also

References

External links

 
 

1960s Czechoslovakian airliners
L-410
Aircraft first flown in 1969
High-wing aircraft
Twin-turboprop tractor aircraft